Albion is a village and historic district in Lincoln, Rhode Island, in the United States.

Albion is home to several mill buildings, churches, and the Kirkbrae Country Club golf course. The historic Blackstone River flows through the center of the mill village with the Blackstone River Greenway, a dual use bicycle & pedestrian path running along the river. Albion Falls is a waterfall along the Blackstone River, and the Albion Bridge crosses the river just downstream from Albion Dam, built in 1916 to power the Albion Mill, now a condominium complex. The word "Albion", from which the mill and village take their name, is the oldest name for Great Britain. The still-active Providence and Worcester Railroad passes through Albion.

See also 

List of bridges documented by the Historic American Engineering Record in Rhode Island
National Register of Historic Places listings in Providence County, Rhode Island

References

External links

References and external links
Providence Journal video of the Blackstone River
Albion Fire Department
Map and location information
St. Ambrose Church in Albion

Villages in Providence County, Rhode Island
Historic districts in Providence County, Rhode Island
Providence metropolitan area
Historic American Engineering Record in Rhode Island
Villages in Rhode Island
Lincoln, Rhode Island
Historic districts on the National Register of Historic Places in Rhode Island
National Register of Historic Places in Providence County, Rhode Island